Pullancheri is a location at Manjeri of Kerala state of India, with hills and one river named Kadalundy River.  Pullancheri is situated 5 kilometres away from Manjeri.  This area is the 27th Ward of Manjeri Municipality.

References

   
Villages in Malappuram district
Manjeri